Aftershock is the 21st studio album by British rock band Motörhead. Originally expected to be released in mid-2013, it was released separately on 18 October in Germany, on 21 October in the rest of Europe, and on 22 October in North America and the rest of the world. It is the fourth album released under the UDR GmbH / Motörhead Music collaboration, with ADA as the distributor for the first time.

Recording
In an August 2012 interview with Artisan News Service during the Rockstar Mayhem Festival tour of 2012, Motörhead drummer Mikkey Dee revealed that the band had written a number of songs already for a follow-up to 2010's The Wörld Is Yours, but that the band were continuing to write. He then went on to say that the new album would be recorded and released in 2013. In an interview with Classic Rock Revisited, Lemmy was asked about the possibility of the album consisting of all covers. Lemmy said that it had been discussed and that "it would be fun to do". He further noted that if a covers album would be made, the band's varying musical tastes would ensure a diverse track listing.

In late October 2012, it was announced that the band had made plans to enter the studio in January 2013. In addition, Cameron Webb, who had produced the previous four albums, would again return to produce the new album. The title was revealed on 18 June 2013.

Release

Aftershock earned mostly positive reviews. Brandon Ringo of New Noise Magazine gave it a full five stars, acclaimed the album as the best Motörhead had released in 20 years, and praised its return to basics.

Sammy O'Hagar of MetalSucks commented, "Everything sounds as snarling and nasty as it always has and always will be."

"The hammer-down moments are the most satisfying", observed Mojo's Phil Alexander, "with 'End of Time', 'Death Machine' and the frenetic 'Queen of the Damned' confirming you will not hear a louder, more defiant rock 'n' roll album this year."

Hank Shteamer of Pitchfork noted that, despite the three-year gap between The Wörld Is Yours and Aftershock, the album offered nothing new. Nevertheless, he called it "deeply satisfying and frequently thrilling… In theory, what the band does might seem overfamiliar, but in practice, it's a minor miracle that they're still doing it so well."

USA Today made Aftershock its album of the week and praised Phil Campbell's contribution, saying the album contains "some of his finest work".

Reviewer Kevin Fitzpatrick remarked on the blues-influences on Aftershock, acknowledging that "[Motörhead have] worn Chuck Berry's, Robert Johnson's and Little Richard's influences on their sleeves for the entirety of their 40 year career."

Aftershock sold 11,000 copies in the United States in its first week, to land at No. 22 on the Billboard 200.

The song "Heartbreaker" was nominated for a 2015 Grammy Award for Best Metal Performance, but lost to Tenacious D's cover of Dio's "The Last in Line."

Track listing

Personnel

Motörhead
 Lemmy – bass, vocals
 Phil Campbell – guitars
 Mikkey Dee – drums

Production
 Cameron Webb – produced, mixed, engineered
 Sergio Chavez – assistant engineer
 Kris Glddens – assistant engineer
 Steve Olmon – assistant engineer
 Geoff Neal – assistant engineer
 Chris Claypool – assistant engineer
 Alan Douches – mastering
 Motörhead – executive producers
 Terje Aspmo – cover art
Lemmy – sketch art
 Steffan Chirazi – creative direction
 Kai Swillus – creative direction
 Robert John – photography

Best of the West Coast Tour 2014
 Cameron Webb – recording
 Andrew Alekiel – mastering
 Ray Ahner – photography

Charts

References

2013 albums
Motörhead albums